The 1961 Connecticut Huskies football team represented the University of Connecticut in the 1961 NCAA College Division football season.  The Huskies were led by tenth-year head coach Bob Ingalls, and completed the season with a record of 2–7.

Schedule

References

Connecticut
UConn Huskies football seasons
Connecticut Huskies football